Xoana is a Galician feminine given name. It can be a variant of Jane/Joanna or the female form of Xoán.

Notable people with the name include:

 Xoana Iacoi (born 1992), Argentine handball player
 Xoana González, contestant of Soñando por Bailar 2011

See also 
 Alternate forms for the name John

Galician given names